Burdickville is a village located within the town of Hopkinton in the U.S. state of Rhode Island. The village is located in the southeastern part of town and is near the border with Charlestown at the Pawcatuck River.

References

Villages in Washington County, Rhode Island
Villages in Rhode Island